Rose Knob Peak is a 9,710-foot-elevation mountain summit located in Washoe County, Nevada, United States.

Description
Rose Knob Peak is set four miles north of Lake Tahoe in the Mount Rose Wilderness, on land managed by the Humboldt-Toiyabe National Forest. It is part of the Carson Range which is a subset of the Sierra Nevada. The Tahoe Rim Trail traverses the slope of the peak, providing an approach option. This landform's toponym has been officially adopted by the U.S. Board on Geographic Names.

Climate

According to the Köppen climate classification system, Rose Knob Peak is located in an alpine climate zone. Most weather fronts originate in the Pacific Ocean, and travel east toward the Sierra Nevada mountains. As fronts approach, they are forced upward by the peaks (orographic lift), causing them to drop their moisture in the form of rain or snowfall onto the range. Most of the snow in Nevada falls from December through March.

See also
 List of Lake Tahoe peaks

Gallery

References

External links
 Weather forecast: Rose Knob Peak
 Rose Knob Peak: Tahoeogul.org

Mountains of Washoe County, Nevada
Mountains of Nevada
Humboldt–Toiyabe National Forest
North American 2000 m summits
Mountains of the Sierra Nevada (United States)